Řezníček (feminine: Řezníčková) is a Czech surname, meaning "little butcher".

 Dalibor Řezníček (1991), Czech ice hockey player
 Emil von Reznicek (1860–1945), Austrian composer
 Ferdinand von Řezníček (1868–1909), Austrian painter and illustrator
 Franz Reznicek (born 1903), Austrian architect
 Jakub Řezníček (born 1988), Czech footballer
 Milan Řezníček (born 1947), Czech volleyball player
 Pavel Řezníček (born 1942), Czech writer

See also
 
 Řezník (disambiguation)

Czech-language surnames
Occupational surnames